Ratchasimasaurus (meaning "Nakhon Ratchasima lizard") is a genus of iguanodontian ornithopod dinosaur from Early Cretaceous (Aptian stage) Khok Kruat Formation of Nakhon Ratchasima Province in northeastern Thailand. The type and only species is R. suranareae, named after Thao Suranari, a 19th-century war heroine. It was considered by one study to be a nomen dubium, diagnosed with characters widespread in Styracosterna.

Discovery and naming
The genus was named in 2011 by Shibata, Jintasakul & Azuma. The holotype is currently housed in The Northeastern Research Institute of Petrified Wood and Mineral Resources (NRIPM) and a mounted skeleton exists in River City, Bangkok.

Description 
One autapomorphy (unique characteristic) of Ratchasimasaurus is its elongated and flat ramus of the dentary. Ratchasimasaurus shows both primitive and derived characters for Iguanodontia, such as "a caudally inclined coronoid process and alveolar trough with a primitive crown impression, and a derived buccal shelf between the tooth row and the coronoid process".

References

External links 

Iguanodonts
Aptian life
Early Cretaceous dinosaurs of Asia
Cretaceous Thailand
Fossils of Thailand
Fossil taxa described in 2011
Ornithischian genera